Receptor-type tyrosine-protein phosphatase zeta also known as phosphacan is an enzyme that in humans is encoded by the PTPRZ1 gene.

Function 

This gene is a member of the receptor tyrosine phosphatase family and encodes a single-pass type I membrane protein with two cytoplasmic tyrosine-protein phosphatase domains, an alpha-carbonic anhydrase domain and a fibronectin type III domain.  Alternative splice variants that encode different protein isoforms have been described but their full-length nature has not been determined.

Clinical significance 

Expression of this gene is induced in gastric cancer cells, in the remyelinating oligodendrocytes of multiple sclerosis lesions, and in human embryonic kidney cells under hypoxic conditions. Both the protein and transcript are overexpressed in glioblastoma cells, promoting their haptotactic migration.

References

Further reading 

 
 
 
 
 
 
 
 
 
 
 
 
 
 
 
 
 

EC 3.1.3